Pet Sematary is a 2019 American supernatural horror film directed by Kevin Kölsch and Dennis Widmyer and written by Jeff Buhler, from a screen story by Matt Greenberg. It is the second adaptation of the 1983 novel of the same name by Stephen King, and a remake to the 1989 film. The film stars Jason Clarke, Amy Seimetz, and John Lithgow, and follows a family that discovers a mysterious graveyard in the woods behind their new home, capable of resurrecting the dead.

Talks for a new adaptation of Pet Sematary began in March 2010, with Greenberg initially writing the screenplay. Lorenzo di Bonaventura and Steven Schneider were revealed to be producing the remake with Juan Carlos Fresnadillo in talks to direct it. By December 2017, Paramount Pictures had greenlit this new film version of King's novel, with duo filmmakers Kölsch and Widmyer directing. Principal photography commenced on June 18, 2018, in Montreal and Hudson, Quebec, Canada, and wrapped on August 11, 2018.

Pet Sematary premiered at South by Southwest festival on March 16, 2019, and was theatrically released in the United States on April 5, 2019, by Paramount Pictures. The film grossed over $113 million worldwide and received mixed reviews from critics, who praised the dark tone, atmosphere and performances, but disliked the slow pacing and reliance on jump scares. Critics and audiences were both divided on the changes between the film and book, though many named it better than the 1989 adaptation.

Plot
After being evicted from their home, Louis Creed, an ER doctor from Boston, Massachusetts, moves to the small town of Ludlow, Maine with his wife, Rachel, their two young children, Ellie and Gage, and Ellie's pet cat, Church. Exploring the woods, Rachel and Ellie stumble across a funeral procession of children taking a dead dog to a cemetery called "Pet Sematary." At the university hospital, Louis is left shaken after failing to save the life of Victor Pascow, a student who was fatally injured after being struck and dragged by a vehicle. He later experiences a vivid dream in which Victor leads him to the deadfall at the back of the cemetery and warns him not to "venture beyond." Louis awakens to find his feet and sheets caked in mud, suggesting that the events were more than just a nightmare.

On Halloween, Church is killed by a truck. Jud Crandall, their neighbor who has a soft spot for Ellie, takes Louis past the pet cemetery to an ancient burial ground to bury Church. The next day, Louis is stunned when Church returns home alive, though he is different: aggressive and violent, tearing apart a bird and eating it alive. Jud reveals to Louis that the burial ground brings things back from the dead and is believed to be inhabited by a spirit known as the Wendigo. He apologizes, having thought Church would return the same. After Church attacks Gage, Louis tries to kill him and he fails. So he decides to set him free in the wild.

During her birthday party, Ellie spots Church on the road and excitedly rushes to him, but is hit and killed by a derailed tanker truck. The family is devastated, and Rachel and Gage leave to spend a few days with Rachel's parents. Sensing that Louis is planning on resurrecting Ellie, Jud warns the grieving father that "sometimes dead is better." Though Victor's spirit similarly warns him, Louis's grief spurs him to carry out his plan. He drugs Jud, exhumes Ellie's corpse, and reburies her in the animal graveyard as the Wendigo looks on. Ellie rises from the dead but manifests a disturbing demeanor.

Meanwhile, Rachel is frightened by visions of her dead sister Zelda, who suffered from spinal meningitis and died after falling down a dumbwaiter shaft. Gage is also frightened by the ghost of Victor who tries to warn him about going home. Jud wakes up and spots Ellie in the house. He flees home in horror to retrieve his revolver, but Jud, distracted by a growling Church, allows Ellie to surprise him on the stairwell—slicing through Jud's Achilles tendon with a scalpel and taunting him with the voice of his dead wife before viciously stabbing him to death.

Rachel and Gage return home and encounter the undead Ellie. Rachel is horrified and flees with Gage to an upstairs bedroom. Ellie, enraged at being rejected by her mother, attacks Rachel as Louis finds Jud's blood-soaked body. Rushing home, Louis manages to save Gage just as Ellie fatally stabs Rachel. He locks Gage in the car, and Rachel begs her husband not to bury her in the pet cemetery. Ellie knocks Louis unconscious and drags her mother's body to the burial ground. At the pet cemetery, Ellie tries to kill Louis. As Louis prepares to decapitate his daughter, he is impaled from behind by a makeshift grave marker, falling and revealing a reanimated Rachel. Ellie and Rachel silently drag Louis away and he is subsequently buried. Rachel, Ellie, Church, and a resurrected Louis set fire to Jud's house before approaching the car. Louis peers into the car at Gage before a beeping sound of the car door unlocking is heard.

Alternate ending 
Louis spares Ellie instead of killing her, and they both bury Rachel behind the pet cemetery, promising that they will be a family together forever. After burning Jud's house, Louis and Ellie approach the family car, where Gage is still locked in. In the house, Ellie, Church, and a newly resurrected Rachel approach and reunite with an unhappy Louis holding Gage, who is crying.

Cast

Production

Development
On March 5, 2010, Paramount Pictures was developing a new adaptation of Stephen King's novel Pet Sematary, and that Matt Greenberg had been hired to write the screenplay. (He was later credited with the "screen story".) By October 2013, Lorenzo di Bonaventura and Steven Schneider were to serve as producers for the production, and Juan Carlos Fresnadillo was in talks to direct.

In August 2017, Andy Muschietti, director of the 2017 film adaptation of Stephen King's It, said that he and his sister, Barbara Muschietti, wanted to adapt Pet Sematary.

On October 30, 2017, it was announced that Paramount Pictures had officially greenlit the film, which was expected to be directed by Kevin Kölsch and Dennis Widmyer, from a screenplay by Jeff Buhler and David Kajganich (the latter went uncredited). Aside from Di Bonaventura and Schneider, Mark Vahradian also produced. Other filmmakers considered were Sean Carter and Johannes Roberts.

Casting
On April 16, 2018, it was announced that Jason Clarke had been cast in the lead role of Louis Creed. On May 4, 2018, it was reported John Lithgow had joined the cast in the role of Jud Crandall.

In June 2018, it was announced that Amy Seimetz would have the film's lead female role, Rachel Creed, along with Jeté Laurence as Creed's daughter Ellie and twins Hugo and Lucas Lavoie as Creed's son Gage.

In October 2018, it was reported that Obssa Ahmed had been added as college student Victor Pascow, and Alyssa Brooke Levine as Zelda Goldman. Zelda was previously portrayed by stuntman Andrew Hubatsek in the 1989 film.

Filming
Principal photography commenced on June 18, 2018, in Hudson, Quebec, Canada. Filming wrapped on August 11, 2018.

Soundtrack
Christopher Young composed the film score. The end credits include a cover version of the Ramones song "Pet Sematary" by American punk rock band Starcrawler. Waxwork Records released the soundtrack on a double LP in 2019 following the release of the film.

Track list

Double LP track list
 The Wendigo
 The Maine Road	
 But The Cat Has No Hat	
 Underground Terrors	
 Fielding Fine	
 Scream For More	
 Dead Alive Again	
 Church Isn't Church	
 Un-Hallowed Even	
 Fouled Soil	
 Echo Angels	
 Just Not The Same	
 Watching The Dead Do	
 Die Daddy Die	
 Wasn't The Beginning?	
 Pet Sematary

Release
The film had its world premiere at South by Southwest on March 16, 2019, and was theatrically released in the United States on April 5, 2019, by Paramount Pictures.

The film was originally going to be released on April 19, 2019, but was moved two weeks from its original release date of April 19, 2019, to April 5, 2019.

Reception

Box office
Pet Sematary grossed $54.7 million in the United States and Canada, and $58.3 million in other territories, for a worldwide total of $113.1 million, against a production budget of $21 million.

In the United States and Canada, Pet Sematary was released alongside Shazam! and The Best of Enemies, and was projected to gross $20–30 million from 2,500 theaters in its opening weekend. It made $2.3 million from Thursday night previews. It then grossed $10 million on its first day, including previews. It went on to debut to $24.5 million, finishing second, behind Shazam!. The film fell 60% in its second weekend to $9.7 million, finishing fourth, and then made $4.9 million in its third weekend, finishing seventh.

Critical response
The website's critical consensus reads: "Pet Sematary takes its source material in a few different directions, but this remake feels like an exhuming almost as often as it does a revival." The rating fell from 92% since the original critical consensus. On Metacritic, the film has a weighted average score of 57 out of 100, based on 42 critics, indicating "mixed or average reviews". Audiences polled by CinemaScore gave the film an average grade of "C+" on an A+ to F scale, while those at PostTrak gave it an overall positive score of 66% and a 47% "definite recommend".

Prequel
In March 2019, di Bonaventura stated that discussions of the development of a prequel had begun. Buhler reaffirmed this, stating that a continuation would explore "digging into the mythology of the town, these rituals that children present, the mythology of the Miꞌkmaq, the Wendigo, the cemetery, the origins, Jud's life."

In February 2021, the film was officially green-lit with Buhler and di Bonaventura returning in their roles as screenwriter and producer, respectively. The project will be released via streaming, as a Paramount+ exclusive film. In May 2021, it was announced Lindsey Beer will make her directing debut with the film. In June 2021, Deadline Hollywood reported that Jackson White was in final negotiations to portray the young Jud Crandall. The same month, Jack Mulhern, Forrest Goodluck, Natalie Alyn Lind and Isabella Star LaBlanc were cast in undisclosed roles, with filming scheduled to commence in August. Samantha Mathis and Henry Thomas were cast in undisclosed roles in August 2021.

References

External links
 
 
 
 

2019 horror films
2019 films
2010s American films
American ghost films
American supernatural horror films
American zombie films
Films set in cemeteries
Films about cats
Films about child death
Films about dysfunctional families
Films about grieving
Films based on American horror novels
Films based on works by Stephen King
Films produced by Lorenzo di Bonaventura
Films scored by Christopher Young
Films set in Maine
Films shot in Montreal
Mariticide in fiction
Matricide in fiction
Paramount Pictures films
Resurrection in film
Pet Sematary
2010s English-language films